Dobrota (Montenegrin and Serbian: Доброта) is a town in the municipality of Kotor, Montenegro.

Although administratively a separate settlement, it is de facto a part of Kotor as it encompasses most of Kotor's residential area, while the settlement of Kotor administratively encompasses only the town's historical core. It gained somewhat of a notoriety among the locals, as the home of Montenegro's only psychiatric hospital.

Demographics

Geography 
Dobrota is situated in the vicinity of the old town of Kotor towards the mountain and peninsula of Vrmac and the town of Prčanj. The town stretches from Kotor to the village of Ljuta, and the river of the same name in the north, where the northern border of the city of Kotor is located, in the length of 7 kilometers.

History 
Dobrota is first mentioned in the Archives of Kotor in the year 1260 AD, as Dabrathum, and afterwards as Dobrotha, from which the modern name derives. The town experienced its own renaissance in the seventeenth and the nineteenth centuries when it had the most ships in the bay. Njegoš considered the Roman Catholics in the town as Serbs, writing to them the poem A Serb thanks the Serbs in honour.

References

External links
 

Populated places in Bay of Kotor
Populated places in Kotor Municipality